The Saturn Award for Best Supporting Actor on Television is presented annually by the Academy of Science Fiction, Fantasy and Horror Films, honoring the work of actors in science fiction, fantasy, and horror fiction on television.

As of the 47th Saturn Awards in 2022, the award is known as Best Supporting Actor in a Network or Cable Television Series and features a sister category: Saturn Award for Best Supporting Actor in a Streaming Television Series.

(NOTE: Year refers to year of eligibility, the actual ceremonies are held the following year.)

The winners are listed in bold.

Winners and nominees

1990s

2000s

2010s

2020s

Multiple nominations
6 nominations
 Michael Emerson
 James Marsters
5 nominations
 Michael Rosenbaum
4 nominations
 Jonathan Banks
 Kit Harington
 John Noble
 Terry O'Quinn
 Aaron Paul
 Norman Reedus
3 nominations
 Nikolaj Coster-Waldau
 Alexis Denisof
 Josh Holloway
 Erik Knudsen
2 nominations
 James Callis
 Tony Dalton
 Giancarlo Esposito
 Victor Garber
 John Glover
 Greg Grunberg
 Ed Harris
 Doug Jones
 Dean Norris
 Masi Oka
 Khary Payton
 Lance Reddick
 Michael Shanks
 Connor Trinneer
 Michael Weatherly

Multiple wins
3 awards
 Aaron Paul

2 awards
 Jonathan Banks
 James Marsters

See also
 Saturn Award for Best Supporting Actor in Streaming Presentation

External links
 
 26th, 27th, 28th, 29th, 30th, 31st, 32nd, 33rd, 34th, 35th, 36th, 37th, 38th, 39th, 40th, 41st, 42nd

Supporting Actor on Television

ja:サターン助演男優賞#テレビ